"A Brand New Day", also known as "Everybody Rejoice", is a song from the 1974 Broadway musical The Wiz written by American R&B singer and songwriter Luther Vandross. (In 1976 Vandross recorded a version of the song for his album Luther, on Cotillion Records.) In the play, the song is sung to celebrate after Dorothy has killed Evillene, the tyrannical Wicked Witch of the West. Dorothy, the Tin Man, the Cowardly Lion, and the Scarecrow sing the song with the newly freed Winkies, who were ruled and enslaved by Evillene. It was later featured in the 1978 film version, sung by cast members Diana Ross, Michael Jackson, Nipsey Russell, and Ted Ross (credited as The Wiz Stars). Given the all-Black cast of The Wiz, the song's many references to freedom and new possibilities (especially as sung by African American characters who had just been freed from enslavement) certainly invoked the struggles and history of Blacks in America. In the onscreen version of the song, Nipsey Russell can even be heard exclaiming "Free at last!"—a reference to civil rights activist Martin Luther King Jr. (His impromptu addition to the song is not heard on the soundtrack album version, instead replaced by sung vocals by Diana Ross.) The song's opening line is sung by Luther Vandross, the song's composer (Vandross' line was to represent one of the Winkies singing and dancing on a table while throwing up an item in the film).

The film version was released as a single in some continental European countries and peaked at #1 in Belgium and The Netherlands, credited to The Wiz Stars featuring Michael Jackson and Diana Ross.

Contents
The single release is an edit of the first half of the song, which in its entirety runs 7:49 on the film's soundtrack. It is backed by the second half of the song, which is labeled as "Liberation Ballet - A Brand New Day." The "Liberation Ballet" is primarily instrumental and is composed of uptempo dance music in a variety of styles, with the film's cast and choir cheering and singing "Can you feel the brand new day" throughout the piece.

Personnel
Diana Ross, Michael Jackson, Nipsey Russell, Ted Ross - vocals

Charts

Weekly charts

Year-end charts

References 

1975 songs
1979 singles
Diana Ross songs
Michael Jackson songs
Songs written for films
Songs from musicals
Song recordings produced by Quincy Jones
Songs written by Luther Vandross
MCA Records singles